The following tables indicate the historic party affiliation of elected officials in the U.S. state of West Virginia, including: Governor, Secretary of State, Attorney General, State Auditor, State Treasurer, and State Agriculture Commissioner. The tables also indicate the historical party composition in the State Senate, State House of Delegates, State delegation to the U.S. Senate, and the State delegation to the U.S. House of Representatives For years in which a presidential election was held, the tables indicate which party's nominees received the state's electoral votes.

1863–1899

1900–1949

1950–1999

2000–present

References

See also
 Politics in West Virginia
 Politics of West Virginia

Politics of West Virginia
Government of West Virginia
West Virginia